Torchbearers International consists of an affiliation of 25 centers around the world. Torchbearers International was founded by evangelist and author Major W. Ian Thomas, in England, in 1947. The headquarters is now at Ravencrest Chalet, Estes Park, Colorado, USA.

Torchbearers International's goal is to provide practical Christian education to develop personal spiritual growth, prepare people for an effective Church life, and teach a working knowledge of the Bible. The organization works by providing a number of Bible schools and Christian conference centers around the world.

Torchbearers' mission is to proclaim the transforming presence of Jesus Christ through biblical teaching and practical training, equipping men and women for service in His church worldwide.

Torchbearers' founder, Major W. Ian Thomas, was an evangelical teacher often identified with the Keswick Convention ministry. The main thrust of their theology is that of the exchanged life or 'Christ in You'.

Theology 

Central to Torchbearers' theology is the belief that the way in which one lives the Christian life is by quieting or extinguishing the self, and allowing Christ to live his life through you in a very literal way. This is the essential teaching of the Keswick Convention, which Major Thomas had been a featured speaker for. His advocation of Keswick theology earned him the label of a "strict Keswick" by M. James Sawyer Th.M., PhD in his article concerning the Keswick movement.[2] While there is no end to the verbiage and metaphor used to describe this process of Christ living through you (Thomas himself never used the term "extinguish oneself"), Major W. Ian Thomas states it in the following manner in the foreword he wrote for well-known Higher Life proponent Bob George in his Higher-Life opus "Classic Christianity".

There are those who have a life they never live. They have come to Christ and thanked Him only for what He did, but do not live in the power of who He is. Between the Jesus who "was" and the Jesus who "will be" they live in a spiritual vacuum, trying with no little zeal to live for Christ a life that only He can live in and through them, perpetually begging for what in Him they already have!

It is further observed that it is man's consent that is the efficacious will that moves God to accomplish sanctification in the life of the believer:

The One who calls you to a life of righteousness is the One who by our consent lives that life of righteousness through you!

History 

Torchbearers International (initially known as the "Capernwray Missionary Fellowship of Torchbearers") began in northern England at Capernwray Hall in 1947.

It was the German youth who came in those early years to Capernwray who began calling themselves the “Fackelträger” or “carriers of the torch”, and so the name “Torchbearers” was born.

According to Thomas:"As a young evangelist, my love and enthusiasm for Christ as my Saviour kept me very, very busy until out of sheer frustration, I finally came to the point of quitting. That was the turning point which transformed my Christian life. In my despair I discovered that the Lord Jesus gave Himself FOR me, so that risen from the dead He might give Himself TO me, He who IS the Christian Life.Instead of pleading for help I began to thank Him for all that He wanted to be, sharing His Life with me every moment of every day. I learned to say “Lord Jesus, I can’t, You never said I could; but You can, and always said You would. That is all I need to know”. From that moment life became the adventure that God always intended it to be. That was the beginning of Torchbearers, and this continues to be the main thrust of our ministry around the world the – Saving Life of Christ.”

Locations 
The organization maintains 25 locations in 20 different countries worldwide.

References 

Bible colleges
Organizations established in 1947
1947 establishments in England